Beba may refer to:

 Bêba, a town in Tibet
 Beba language, spoken in Cameroon
 Beba Village Community in Cameroon
 Beba Veche, a commune in Timiș County, Romania
 Beba (grape) a wine and table grape from Extremadura, Spain

See also
 Beabadoobee, a Filipino-British singer-songwriter